Eric Stanley Peterson (born May 14, 1964) is an American musician, best known as the rhythm guitarist of the American thrash metal band Testament and is the only remaining original member left in the band, which first started in 1983 under the name Legacy. He and lead vocalist Chuck Billy are the only members to appear on all of the band's studio albums.

Peterson also has a side project black metal band called Dragonlord, in which he plays guitar and also sings. In Testament, Peterson was originally a rhythm guitarist while Alex Skolnick handled all lead work. More recently though, Peterson plays leads along with Skolnick.

Musical influences
Peterson has cited Led Zeppelin, Black Sabbath, Aerosmith, Kiss, Judas Priest, Boston, Scorpions, UFO, Montrose, Pat Travers and Mahogany Rush (with Frank Marino) as influences and inspirations to him. When forming the sound of Legacy/Testament, he had been influenced by the band's Bay Area peers Metallica and Exodus, in addition to NWOBHM bands such as Judas Priest, Venom, Saxon and Angel Witch, and European heavy metal bands like Mercyful Fate.

Personal life
His father was of Swedish descent and his mother was of Mexican descent.

Peterson was married to Kirk Hammett's ex-wife Rebecca, with whom he has one child. They are now divorced.

Equipment
Peterson's main guitars have been Gibson models for most of his career in Testament, primarily a black Explorer model and a Les Paul.  Recently, however, he is endorsing Dean Guitars and has been using his own signature Dean V guitar.

Discography

With Legacy
 Demo 1 (1984)
 Demo 2 (1985)

With Testament
The Legacy (1987)
The New Order (1988)
Practice What You Preach (1989)
Souls of Black (1990)
The Ritual (1992)
Return to the Apocalyptic City (1993)
Low (1994)
Demonic (1997)
The Gathering (1999)
First Strike Still Deadly (2001)
The Formation of Damnation (2008)
Dark Roots of Earth (2012)
Brotherhood of the Snake (2016)
Titans of Creation (2020)

With Dragonlord
Rapture (2001)
Black Wings of Destiny (2005)
Dominion (2018)

With Leah McHenry
"Dreamland" (2013)
"Winter Sun" (2015)

As guest

Old Man's Child – Vermin (2005)
Leah McHenry - Otherworld EP (2013)

Equipment
Amplifier: Kemper, Marshall JVM series 210 watt head, Mesa/Boogie Triple Rectifier Heads, and EVH 5150 heads
Cabinets: Cathedral Guitar Cabinets model: Bishop (4x12)(on tour in Europe since 2022), Mesa 4x12  Recto Cabinets loaded with Celestion vintage 30s & EVH III Cabinets
Effects: Dunlop Cry Baby from Hell Wah, Boss TU-2 Tuner, MXR Flanger, MXR Stereo Chorus, TC Electronic Nova Delay
Cords: Monster Cable
Guitars: Dean Cadillac, Dean Michael Schenker V, Gibson Flying V, Dean Eric Peterson Signature OldSkull V
Strings: DR Gauge 10–52(tuned one AND half step down, i.e. Db Gb B E Ab Db or C# F# B E G# c#)
Pickups: Dean Flying V: EMG 85 (neck) & EMG 81 (bridge), Dean Time Capsule: Dimarzio Super Distortion Zebras, Dean Cadillac: Seymor Duncan '59 (sh-1n neck) & jazz (sh-2 middle), jb (sh-4 bridge)
Picks: Dunlop Purple & Green sharp

References

1964 births
20th-century American guitarists
21st-century American guitarists
American heavy metal guitarists
American male guitarists
American musicians of Mexican descent
American people of Mexican descent
American people of Swedish descent
American black metal musicians
Guitarists from California
Hispanic and Latino American musicians
Living people
People from Berkeley, California
Place of birth missing (living people)
Rhythm guitarists
Testament (band) members

nl:Eric Peterson